Athletes from East Germany (German Democratic Republic; GDR) and West Germany (Federal Republic of Germany; FRG) competed together as the United Team of Germany for the last time at the 1964 Summer Olympics in Tokyo, Japan. 337 competitors, 275 men and 62 women, took part in 159 events in 19 sports.

Medalists
Nationality in brackets.

Gold
 Karin Balzer — Athletics, Women's 80m Hurdles
 Willi Holdorf — Athletics, Men's Decathlon
 Jürgen Eschert — Canoeing, Men's C1 1.000m Canoe Singles
 Roswitha Esser, Annemarie Zimmermann (both from ) — Canoeing, Women's K2 500m Kayak Pairs
 Lothar Claesges, Karl-Heinz Henrichs, Karl Link, Ernst Streng (all from ) — Cycling, Men's Team Pursuit
 Ingrid Engel-Krämer — Diving, Women's 3m Springboard
 Harry Boldt, Reiner Klimke, Josef Neckermann (all from ) — Equestrian, Dressage Team
 Hermann Schridde, Kurt Jarasinski, Hans Günter Winkler (all from ) — Equestrian, Jumping Team
 Peter Neusel, Bernhard Britting, Joachim Werner, Egbert Hirschfelder, Jürgen Oelke (all from ) — Rowing, Men's Coxed Fours
 Wilhelm Kuhweide — Sailing, Finn

Silver
 Harald Norpoth — Athletics, Men's 5.000 metres
 Dieter Lindner — Athletics, Men's 20 km Walk
 Wolfgang Reinhardt — Athletics, Men's Pole Vault
 Renate Culmberger — Athletics, Women's Shot Put
 Ingrid Lotz — Athletics, Women's Discus Throw
 Emil Schulz — Boxing, Men's Middleweight
 Hans Huber — Boxing, Men's Heavyweight
 Günter Perleberg, Bernhard Schulze, Friedhelm Wentzke, Holger Zander (all from ) — Canoeing, K4 1.000m Kayak Fours
 Ingrid Engel-Krämer — Diving, Women's 10m Platform
 Harry Boldt — Equestrian, Dressage Individual
 Hermann Schridde — Equestrian, Jumping Individual
 Helga Mees — Fencing, Individual Foil
 Birgit Radochla — Gymnastics, Women's Vault
 Wolfgang Hofmann — Judo, Men's 80 kg
 Achim Hill — Rowing, Men's Single Sculls
 Klaus Aeffke, Klaus Bittner, Karl-Heinrich von Groddeck, Hans-Jürgen Wallbrecht, Klaus Behrens, Jürgen Schröder, Jürgen Plagemann, Horst Meyer, Thomas Ahrens (all from ) — Rowing, Men's Eight
 Peter Ahrendt, Wilfried Lorenz, Ulrich Mense (all from ) — Sailing, Dragon
 Frank Wiegand — Swimming, Men's 400m Freestyle
 Horst Löffler, Frank Wiegand, Uwe Jacobsen, Hans-Joachim Klein — Swimming, Men's 4 × 100 m Freestyle Relay
 Horst-Günter Gregor, Gerhard Hetz, Frank Wiegand, Hans-Joachim Klein — Swimming, Men's 4 × 200 m Freestyle Relay
 Ernst-Joachim Küppers, Egon Henninger, Horst-Günter Gregor, Hans-Joachim Klein — Swimming, Men's 4 × 100 m Medley Relay
 Klaus Rost — Wrestling, Men's Freestyle Lightweight

Bronze
 Klaus Lehnertz — Athletics, Men's Pole Vault
 Uwe Beyer — Athletics, Men's Hammer Throw
 Hans-Joachim Walde — Athletics, Men's Decathlon
 Heinz Schulz — Boxing, Men's Featherweight
 Heinz Büker, Holger Zander (both from ) — Canoeing, K2 1.000m Kayak Pairs
 Willi Fuggerer, Klaus Kobusch (both from ) — Cycling, Men's Tandem
 Fritz Ligges — Equestrian, Three-Day Event Individual
 Fritz Ligges, Horst Karsten, Gerhard Schulz — Equestrian, Three-Day Event Team
 Heidi Schmid, Helga Mees, Rosemarie Scherberger, Gudrun Theuerkauff (all from ) — Fencing, Women's Team Foil
 Gerd Backhaus, Wolfgang Barthels, Bernd Bauchspieß, Gerhard Körner, Otto Fräßdorf, Henning Frenzel, Dieter Engelhardt, Herbert Pankau, Manfred Geisler, Jürgen Heinsch, Klaus Lisiewicz, Jürgen Nöldner, Peter Rock, Klaus-Dieter Seehaus, Hermann Stöcker, Werner Unger, Klaus Urbanczyk, Eberhard Vogel, Manfred Walter, Horst Weigang (all from ) — Football, Men's Team Competition
 Siegfried Fülle, Philipp Fürst, Erwin Koppe, Klaus Köste, Günter Lyhs, Peter Weber — Gymnastics, Men's Team All-Around
 Klaus Glahn — Judo, Men's Open Category
 Michael Schwan, Wolfgang Hottenrott (both from ) — Rowing, Men's Coxless Pairs
 Hans-Joachim Klein — Swimming, Men's 100m Freestyle
 Gerhard Hetz — Swimming, Men's 400m Individual Medley
 Lothar Metz — Wrestling, Men's Greco-Roman Middleweight
 Heinz Kiehl — Wrestling, Men's Greco-Roman Light Heavyweight
 Wilfried Dietrich — Wrestling, Men's Greco-Roman Heavyweight

Athletics

Boxing

Canoeing

Cycling

Thirteen cyclists represented Germany in 1964.

Individual road race
 Wilfried Peffgen
 Burkhard Ebert
 Immo Rittmeyer
 Günter Hoffmann

Team time trial
 Burkhard Ebert
 Günter Hoffmann
 Peter Glemser
 Immo Rittmeyer

Sprint
 Willi Fuggerer
 Ulrich Schillinger

1000m time trial
 Lothar Claesges

Tandem
 Willi Fuggerer
 Klaus Kobusch

Individual pursuit
 Lothar Spiegelberg

Team pursuit
 Lothar Claesges
 Karl Heinz Henrichs
 Karl Link
 Ernst Streng

Diving

Equestrian

Fencing

19 fencers, 15 men and 4 women, represented Germany in 1964.

Men's foil
 Tim Gerresheim
 Jürgen Brecht
 Dieter Schmitt

Men's team foil
 Jürgen Brecht, Dieter Wellmann, Eberhard Mehl, Tim Gerresheim, Jürgen Theuerkauff

Men's épée
 Franz Rompza
 Dietrich Hecke
 Paul Gnaier

Men's team épée
 Franz Rompza, Max Geuter, Volkmar Würtz, Paul Gnaier, Haakon Stein

Men's sabre
 Walter Köstner
 Dieter Wellmann
 Jürgen Theuerkauff

Men's team sabre
 Dieter Wellmann, Klaus Allisat, Walter Köstner, Jürgen Theuerkauff, Percy Borucki

Women's foil
 Helga Mees
 Heidi Schmid
 Romy Weiß-Scherberger

Women's team foil
 Helga Mees, Heidi Schmid, Romy Weiß-Scherberger, Gundi Theuerkauff

Field hockey

Twelve male field hockey players competed in 1964, when the German team finished in 5th place.

 Rainer Stephan
 Axel Thieme
 Klaus Vetter
 Horst Brennecke
 Klaus Bahner
 Horst Dahmlos
 Lothar Lippert
 Rolf Westphal
 Karlheinz Freiberger
 Dieter Ehrlich
 Adolf Krause
 Reiner Hanschke

Football

Gymnastics

Judo

Modern pentathlon

Three male pentathletes represented Germany in 1964.

Individual
 Wolfgang Gödicke
 Uwe Adler
 Elmar Frings

Team
 Wolfgang Gödicke
 Uwe Adler
 Elmar Frings

Rowing

The United Team of Germany had 26 male rowers participate in all seven rowing events in 1960.

 Men's single sculls – 2nd place ( silver medal)
 Achim Hill

 Men's double sculls – 5th place
 Helmut Lebert
 Josef Steffes-Mies

 Men's coxless pair – 3rd place ( bronze medal)
 Michael Schwan
 Wolfgang Hottenrott

 Men's coxed pair
 Günter Bergau
 Peter Gorny
 Karl-Heinz Danielowski

 Men's coxless four
 Günter Schroers
 Horst Effertz
 Albrecht Müller
 Manfred Misselhorn

 Men's coxed four – 1st place ( gold medal)
 Peter Neusel
 Bernhard Britting
 Joachim Werner
 Egbert Hirschfelder
 Jürgen Oelke

 Men's eight – 2nd place ( silver medal)
 Klaus Aeffke
 Klaus Bittner
 Karl-Heinrich von Groddeck
 Hans-Jürgen Wallbrecht
 Klaus Behrens
 Jürgen Schröder
 Jürgen Plagemann
 Horst Meyer
 Thomas Ahrens

Sailing

Shooting

Ten shooters represented Germany in 1964.

25 m pistol
 Lothar Jacobi
 Gerhard Feller

50 m pistol
 Johann Garreis
 Hans Kaupmannsennecke

300 m rifle, three positions
 Harry Köcher
 Klaus Zähringer

50 m rifle, three positions
 Harry Köcher
 Klaus Zähringer

50 m rifle, prone
 Karl Wenk
 Rudolf Bortz

Trap
 Joachim Marscheider
 Heinz Rehder

Swimming

Water polo

Weightlifting

Wrestling

References

External links
 Official Olympic Reports
 International Olympic Committee results database
 list of all German participants of 1964 (pages 561 to 567)

Nations at the 1964 Summer Olympics
1964
Summer Olympics